Alexandre Baldy de Sant'Anna Braga (Goiânia, July 21, 1980) is a Brazilian industrialist and politician affiliated with Progressistas (PP). He is currently secretary of Metropolitan Transport in the state of São Paulo, under the João Doria (PSDB) government.

Baldy had been federal congressperson in Goiás and Minister of Cities in Brazil. Between 2011 and 2013, he was Secretary of Industry and Commerce in Goiás, appointed by Governador Marconi Perillo.

On August 6, 2020 Baldy was arrested at his home, at Haddock Lobo Street (São Paulo-SP), during an action by the Federal Police as a result of Operation Lava-Jato, which was cancelled the following day by the STF minister, Gilmar Mendes. According to the Supreme Court’s text, “In the case of the procedural records, the possibility of decreeing the claimant’s preventive detention was expressly ruled out in the contested decision, given the absolute lack of contemporaneity of the investigated facts.”.

Biography
In the 2014 elections, held on 5 October 2014, Baldy was elected Federal Deputy as member of the Brazilian Social Democracy Party (PSDB) from Goiás for the 55th Legislature (2015–2019). During the Legislature, joined Podemos (PODE, former PTN).

Voted "Yes" during the Impeachment of Dilma Rousseff. Later, helped the approval of the Constitutional Amendment No. 95 of 2016 (Constitutional Amendment Project of "Ceiling" of Public Expenditure). In April 2017 supported the Labor Reform. On 2 August 2017 he voted against the process which asked for opening of investigation of president Michel Temer, helping discontinue the complaint from the Federal Public Prosecutor's Office.

On the same day, Alexandre was withdrawn from the leadership of Podemos. Later, announced his leaving from the party. Months later, president Michel Temer nominated him for the Ministry of Cities, replacing Bruno Araújo. With the announcement, Baldy said he will join the Progressive Party (PP) to take office as Minister.

References

External links
 
 Deputado Alexandre Baldy, Chamber of Deputies

|-

1980 births
Living people
Government ministers of Brazil
Progressistas politicians
Podemos (Brazil) politicians
Brazilian Social Democracy Party politicians
Members of the Chamber of Deputies (Brazil) from Goiás
People from Goiânia